Ipomoea asarifolia, the ginger-leaf morning-glory, is a species of plant in the family Convolvulaceae, of the genus Ipomoea.

References

External links

asarifolia
Flora of Nigeria
Least concern plants